The Most Charming and Attractive is a 1985 Soviet romantic comedy film directed by Gerald Bezhanov.

Plot
Nadya Klyueva, a very nice employee of one research institute cannot arrange her personal life. She is more than thirty years old, yet still unmarried. She occasionally meets her former schoolmate Susanna in a bus. After that Nadya's life begins to change. Susanna is a professional sociologist and gives Nadya practical advice on how to change her behavior and clothing to get married successfully. The object of Nadya's courtship is her colleague Volodya, frivolous "Don Juan". But soon Nadya realizes that her happiness and love that she sought through a variety of tricks and efforts is just an illusion.

Cast
 Irina Muravyova as Nadya Klyueva, SRI employee
 Tatyana Vasileva as Susanna,  Nadya's experienced  friend
 Aleksandr Abdulov as Volodya Smirnov, Nadya's colleague, SRI employee
 Leonid Kuravlyov as Pasha Diatlov, Nadya's colleague, SRI employee
 Mikhail Kokshenov as Lyoha Priakhin, Nadya's colleague, SRI employee
 Lyudmila Ivanova as Claudia Matveevna Stepankova, Nadya's colleague, SRI employee
 Larisa Udovichenko as Lyucya Vinogradova, Nadya's colleague, SRI employee
 Lev Perfilov as Pyotr  Vasilievich, Nadya's chief
 Vladimir Nosik as Gena Sysoev, Nadya's friend and colleague, engineer
 Alexander Schirvindt as Arkady, Susanna's husband
 Lyubov Sokolova as Nadya's mother
 Vera Sotnikova as Sveta, Volodya Smirnov's girlfriend
 Viktor Filippov as policeman
 Igor Yasulovich as huckster
 Veronica Izotova as fellow traveler on train
 Viktor Ilichyov as Dima, fellow traveler's husband

References

External links

1985 romantic comedy films
1985 films
Soviet romantic comedy films
Mosfilm films
Films shot in Moscow
Films set in the Soviet Union
Russian romantic comedy films